WJGA-FM (92.1 FM) broadcasts from Jackson, Georgia, on 92.1 MHz from a 285 feet above ground level tower at 5,500 watts ERP. WJGA-FM is owned by Earnhart Broadcasting Co., Inc.

Programming
WJGA-FM broadcasts a wide range of entertainment including oldies, current hits, R&B, and gospel. WJGA has a large assortment of local oriented broadcasts including Jackson High School sporting events, Local community events, and local originating news programming. Besides covering the local Butts County, Georgia, area it covers most of the southeast metro Atlanta area south to Macon, west to Thomaston, and east to Eatonton. The past five Christmases they simulcasted classic country from its sister station WKKP 1410 AM in McDonough, Georgia for  the holiday.

On Air Personalities
Don Earnhart,
Susanne Earnhart,
Tom Lynde,
Todd Wilson,
Hannah Thomas,
Robert Gulley,
Chad Sheppard,
Sonny Weaver

External links

JGA
1967 establishments in Georgia (U.S. state)
Radio stations established in 1967